Mesomyza is a genus of flies in the family Stratiomyidae.

Species
Mesomyza interrupta Enderlein, 1921
Mesomyza sericea Enderlein, 1921
Mesomyza tenuicornis Enderlein, 1921

References

Stratiomyidae
Brachycera genera
Taxa named by Günther Enderlein
Diptera of South America